Leptodactylus rhodonotus is a species of frog in the family Leptodactylidae.
It is found in Bolivia, Brazil, Colombia, and Peru.
Its natural habitats are subtropical or tropical moist lowland forests, subtropical or tropical moist montane forests, intermittent rivers, swamps, freshwater marshes, intermittent freshwater marshes, arable land, rural gardens, heavily degraded former forest, aquaculture ponds, irrigated land, and canals and ditches.

References

rhodonotus
Amphibians of Bolivia
Amphibians of Brazil
Amphibians of Colombia
Amphibians of Peru
Amphibians described in 1868
Taxonomy articles created by Polbot